Dheena Chandra Dhas (born in Madras (now Chennai), India, on 1 August 1956) is an actor, singer, voice over artist and sound engineer. He is the youngest of 4 brothers and the younger brother of the well-known 70s musician Madhukar C. Dhas. He lives in Kodaikanal, Tamil Nadu, India, and does Voice Overs in his home-studio.

Music
His musical career is varied, with over three decades of experience in radio, studio sound mixing, live concert mixing, and performing on stage.

Bands
Over the years he has been the lead vocalist in multiple rock bands in India and Abroad. 
 Magic (Madras)
 Desire (Madras)
 Commandoes (Madras)
 The Phantom Revival (Bombay) and
 Satin (Dubai).

Playback Singing
He sang "Zahreela Zahreela Pyar" for the film Daud, composed by A R Rahman, alongside Asha Bhonsle. He was also a childhood friend of Rahman, and played along with Rahman, Sivamani, Jojo etc.

Stage Acting
He has also performed for a number of musicals in Madras and elsewhere in India, singing and acting on stage in productions such as Jesus Christ Superstar as Judas, Cats (the musical),  Tommy, Joseph and the Amazing Technicolor Dreamcoat, Starlight Express, and Witness.

Acting
His film acting career began when he was offered the role of "Raju" in both the Hindi and Tamil versions of Kamal Haasan's Mumbai Xpress. He also plays the Lungiman in Peter Yesley's short film, Lungiman Takes a Ride.

On television, he has acted in some Tamil soap operas, Kolangal being one of them.

Voice, Voice Acting & Narration
Dheena's signature, a deep voice, has been used many times in the media. In addition to being the narrator in various plays over the years, he has also dubbed for a number of Indian movies, including dubbing for various British characters in the film 1921 by I. V. Sasi, and various ad jingles. He currently provides voice over services from his studio in Kodaikanal.

References

External links
 Dheena Chandra Dhas Voice Over Samples
 
 
 
 Lungiman Takes a Ride
 Credited as Narrator for Tommy
 

Singers from Chennai
1956 births
Living people
Indian male voice actors
Indian male playback singers
Musicians from Chennai
Musicians from Tamil Nadu
Indian male musicians